The Pique d'Endron is a French pyrenean summit which lies in the Ariège in Région Occitanie.

Pyrenees
Mountains of Occitania (administrative region)